John Corbus (October 25, 1907 – March 22, 1966), born Vallejo, California, was a decorated submarine commander during World War II who reached the rank of Rear Admiral in the United States Navy. He graduated in 1930 from the U.S. Naval Academy at Annapolis.

References

1907 births
1966 deaths
Military personnel from Vallejo, California
United States submarine commanders
United States Navy rear admirals (lower half)
United States Naval Academy alumni
Recipients of the Navy Cross (United States)
Burials at Golden Gate National Cemetery
United States Navy personnel of the Korean War
United States Navy personnel of World War II